Adégòkè is both a surname and a given name of Yoruba origin meaning "the crown or royalty has ascended to the top, or has gained advancement". Notable people with the name include:

 Adegoke Adelabu (1915–1958), Nigerian politician
 Adegoke Olubummo (1923–1992), Nigerian academic and mathematician
 Enoch Olaoluwa Adegoke (born 2000), a Nigerian sprinter
 Jimmy Adegoke (born 1963), climate scientist and professor at the University of Missouri-Kansas City
 Mutiu Adegoke (born 1984), Nigerian football defender
 Saidat Adegoke (born 1985), Nigerian footballer
 Sam Adegoke, Nigerian actor
 Sarah Adegoke (born 1997), Nigerian tennis player

References 

Yoruba-language surnames
Yoruba given names